The Colgate Far East Open was a golf tournament on the LPGA Tour from 1974 to 1979. It was an unofficial event in 1974 and 1975.

Tournament locations

Winners
Colgate Far East Open
1979 Silvia Bertolaccini
1978 Nancy Lopez
1977 Silvia Bertolaccini

Colgate Far East Championship
1976 Amy Alcott

As unofficial event
Colgate Far East Ladies Tournament
1975 Pat Bradley

Colgate Far East Open
1974 Sandra Post

References

Former LPGA Tour events
Recurring sporting events established in 1974
Recurring sporting events disestablished in 1979
Golf tournaments in Australia
Golf tournaments in the Philippines
Golf tournaments in Singapore
Golf tournaments in Malaysia
1974 establishments in Australia
1979 disestablishments in the Philippines